is a 2019 fighting game developed by Team Ninja and published by Koei Tecmo. It is the sixth main entry in the Dead or Alive fighting series. The game was released for PlayStation 4, Windows, and Xbox One on March 1, 2019, and was also released in the Arcades in Japan on July 18, 2019. Running on a new engine, the game included new features and introduced new mechanics. 

Dead or Alive 6 was praised for its polished gameplay, battle arenas, and its beginner-friendly tutorials, but was criticized for its multiplayer functions as well as the absence of online lobbies at launch. A free-to-play version of the game titled Dead or Alive 6: Core Fighters was released on March 15, 2019.

Gameplay

New features include slow-motion moments and visible damage on the fighters during the course of the fight, while the sweat effects from Dead or Alive 5 return and are more pronounced. Dead or Alive 6 also marks the first time for the series to have costume customization mode. The game adds blood effects and new violence physics that can be user-adjusted or turned off in the options.

The game is supposed to be more accessible for newcomers. New mechanics introduced are the Fatal Rush, a beginner-friendly mechanic where pressing one button multiple times results in the character performing a simple combo, and the Break Gauge, a meter that builds up as the characters attack. If the Gauge is full, a Fatal Rush will culminate in a Break Blow, similar to what the Critical Blow in Dead or Alive 5 would do. There is a new mechanic named the Break Hold, where the character reverses an opponent, stunning them, before appearing behind them, open for a counter. The juggling ground-bounce system in this game is also being enhanced to extend juggle combos.

Characters

The game currently has 31 playable characters. According to the developers during an interview, it was originally not going to feature the characters who were introduced in Dead or Alive Xtreme 3 Venus Vacation and Scarlet, but has been decided to include one of them as candidate DLC characters, starting from Season 4, with the first one being Tamaki. One of the future candidate DLC characters also includes one of veterans such as Momiji from Ninja Gaiden, who was announced in the second DLC pass. There are also two SNK guest characters, including Mai Shiranui returning from Dead or Alive 5 Last Round. The other SNK guest for the collaboration promoting the fourteenth installment of The King of Fighters game was later confirmed to be Kula Diamond.

New
Diego, a Mexican-American street fighter hailing from New York City. He enters the tournament in order to provide funding for his sick mother.
Kula Diamond  , a modified human created by an organization called NESTS. She is the second guest character from The King of Fighters alongside Mai Shiranui.
NiCO, a M.I.S.T. scientist and silat martial artist from Finland. She wears a pair of EMF rings to utilize lightning-based attacks.
Tamaki , a former model turned fashion designer who fights using aikido.

Returning

Ayane
Bass Armstrong
Bayman
Brad Wong
Christie
Eliot
Hayate
Helena Douglas
Hitomi
Honoka
Jann Lee
Kasumi
Kokoro
La Mariposa
Leifang
Mai Shiranui  
Marie Rose
Mila
Momiji 
Nyotengu 
Phase 4 
Rachel 
Raidou
Rig
Ryu Hayabusa
Tina Armstrong
Zack

 Downloadable content
 Guest character

Plot

The game follows the events of Dead or Alive 5. Kasumi, a would-be leader of the legendary Mugen Tenshin ninja clan, who has abandoned her clan and became a "runaway ninja", secretly lives in a hermitage in a mountain village, while the reformed DOATEC corporation is still run by Helena Douglas.

Development and release
Team Ninja began full-time development on Dead or Alive 6 in December 2017 and publicly revealed it in June 2018. It was developed using a new graphics engine, which was created to power multiple Koei Tecmo titles. The studio announced they sought to slightly tone down the sexualized portrayal of female characters and focused on being an esports title. A single-player campaign, which was described as "cohesive" by director and producer Yohei Shimbori, was developed so that the game can appeal to both casual gamers and the Western audience. A new character Diego was also designed specifically in mind for American males aged 25 to 35. Tag team mode of the previous games isn't featured due to the team focusing all its resources on one vs one modes.

Shimbori later denied that the game has been censored due to the new Sony standards against sexual content in PlayStation games and promised it would be at the DOA5 standards, claiming to having been repeatedly misunderstood or mistranslated on the issue. He also cited the unfavorable perception of the previous games by "some media outlets" as a reason for the changes and blamed the reduction of female clothing damage on otherwise being unable to distribute the game in the Western stores, (despite there being full clothing damage in SoulCalibur VI, released five months before and featuring a lower ESRB rating) stating he has been trying to avoid the repetition of the situation with Dead or Alive Xtreme 3 where they could not sell it in Europe and North America. Nevertheless, an Evo Japan 2019 official stream, featuring gravure idols Yuka Kuramochi and Saki Yoshida, was shut down and apologized for by the Evolution Championship Series president Joey Cuellar and head of business development Mark Julio citing "core values".

An open beta version was made available between January 12–14 for the PlayStation Plus subscribers. A new demo has been exclusive to PlayStation Plus and Xbox Live Gold members between February 22–24.

Dead or Alive 6 was released for PlayStation 4, Windows, and Xbox One on March 1, 2019, delayed two weeks from the original release date of February 15. Limited edition items in Japan include life-size bed sheets of Ayane and Kasumi, a bath poster of Ayane and Kasumi, and bust and buttocks shaped 3D mousepads of Honoka and Marie Rose. The in-game Nyotengu and Phase 4 characters have been included in pre-order and deluxe edition bonuses, along with exclusive costumes.

Similar to Dead or Alive 5, Dead or Alive 6 also has a "Core Fighters" free-to-play version, which was made available two week later on March 15. An arcade version was announced in late 2018 and was released on July 18, 2019.

The first downloadable content (DLC) season pass, costing more than the base game, adds two additional character as well as 62 new costumes. Momiji returned as DLC, released on September 19, 2019. Rachel also returns as DLC, released on December, 2019.

The game features a Wi-Fi filter.

Reception

According to review aggregator Metacritic, Dead or Alive 6 has received "mixed or average" reviews for the Windows and PlayStation 4 version, and received "generally favorable" reviews for the Xbox One version.

IGN's Mike Epstein said: "DoA 6 proves there's plenty of depth to this fighter beneath its skimpy outfits, but its story mode is disjointed and its multiplayer features are currently bare." GameSpot's Heidi Kemps said, "despite some missteps, DoA6 is a fun, engaging fighter with great-feeling, easy-to-pick-up combat, a strong sense of visual style, and a lot of personality. If you're looking for a new fighting game to learn the ins and outs of--or perhaps a nice entry into the 3D side of fighting games--DoA6 is a fighter of choice."

In a mixed review, Game Informer said that "while the tutorial and DOA Quest mode do a decent job of getting you up to speed on what makes combat tick, the awful story mode does it no favors, and the barebones online puts a damper on what could have been a second wind for the series."

EGMNows Mollie Patterson, who reviewed the game, stated that "if its flaws can be forgiven, it's still a genuinely decent new Dead or Alive chapter that offers most of what fans have loved in the past. And, even if they are a pain to unlock, I love some of the non-paid alt costumes we've been given."

Sales
In Japan, approximately 26,442 physical units for PS4 were sold during its launch week becoming the number one selling game of any format. 350,000 units of the game have been shipped worldwide during the first month across all three platforms. By May 2019, the game had been downloaded 1 million times. The number of digital versions' owners crossed 2 million by December of that year.

Awards

References

External links

2019 video games
3D fighting games
ALL.Net games
Dead or Alive (franchise) video games
Free-to-play video games
Multiplayer and single-player video games
Multiplayer online games
Video games about ninja
PlayStation 4 games
Fighting games
Video game sequels
Video games with AI-versus-AI modes
Dinosaurs in video games
Video games developed in Japan
Video games featuring female protagonists
Video games set in China
Video games set in Japan
Video games set in New York City
Video games set in the United States
Video games set on islands
Video games set in the 21st century
Windows games
Xbox One games
Koei Tecmo games